Southend 200A is an Indian reserve of the Peter Ballantyne Cree Nation in Saskatchewan. It is adjacent to the west side of Southend 200. In the 2016 Canadian Census, it recorded a population of 128 living in 30 of its 37 total private dwellings. In the same year, its Community Well-Being index was calculated at 49 of 100, compared to 58.4 for the average First Nations community and 77.5 for the average non-Indigenous community.

References

Indian reserves in Saskatchewan
Peter Ballantyne Cree Nation